Salem Ben Hmida  was a Tunisian poet. He was born in 1882 and died in 1961.

Born in Akouda, just north of  Sousse, he studied at the University of Ez-Zitouna. In 1947, he chaired the Sahelian cooperation within the Tunisian General Labour Union.

He published a book of poems entitled Azzahriyyet. Today there is a road in Sousse and several schools named after him.

References

19th-century Tunisian poets
1882 births
1961 deaths
20th-century poets
20th-century Tunisian poets